The horseshoe is an open-faced sandwich originating in Springfield, Illinois, United States.  It consists of thick-sliced toasted bread (often Texas toast), a hamburger patty or other choice of meat, French fries, and cheese sauce.  

While hamburger has become the most common meat on a horseshoe, the original meat was ham.  The "horseshoe" name has been variously attributed to the horseshoe-like shape of a slice of bone-in ham, or to the horseshoe-like arrangement of potato wedges around the ham.

It is not uncommon to substitute other meat for the hamburger, such as chicken or ham, or use more than one type of meat. The fries may also be substituted with tater tots, waffle fries, or other forms of fried potatoes. 

Though cheese sauces vary by chef, it is generally derived from Welsh rarebit. Common ingredients include eggs, stale beer, butter, sharp cheddar cheese, Worcestershire sauce, flour, dry mustard, paprika, salt and pepper, and a dash of cayenne pepper.

A smaller portion, with one slice of bread and one serving of meat, is called a pony shoe.

A breakfast horseshoe is also available. The hamburger and french fries are replaced with sausage or bacon, eggs, and hash browns. The cheese sauce can also be substituted with milk gravy.

Ross' Restaurant in Bettendorf, Iowa is known for a similar dish called the Magic Mountain. Instead of a hamburger patty, the sandwich contains steamed loose-meat. It has been enjoyed by politicians and celebrities including Barack Obama and Bette Midler.

See also 
 Cuisine of the Midwestern United States
 Hot hamburger plate, a Southeastern open-faced sandwich with fries
 Slinger, a St. Louis diner food
 Gerber sandwich, a St. Louis open-faced sandwich
 St. Paul sandwich, a sandwich from St. Louis, not St. Paul
 Chip butty, a similar sandwich made with French fries
 Garbage Plate
 St. Louis cuisine
 List of regional dishes of the United States
 List of sandwiches

References

Works cited 

Fast food
American sandwiches
Cuisine of Illinois
Springfield, Illinois
Cheese sandwiches
Beef sandwiches
Open-faced sandwiches
Hot sandwiches